Kemeri 1937 was a chess tournament held in the resort town Ķemeri, Latvia, at the Gulf of Riga from 16 June to 8 July 1937. There were three co-winners: Samuel Reshevsky, Salo Flohr and Vladimir Petrov. Petrovs was one of the world's leading chess players in the late 1930s (e.g., the 8th Chess Olympiad at Buenos Aires 1939), but due to the political tragedies that befell the Baltic states in World War II, he became a victim of the Soviet oppression and perished in Kotlas (Russia) gulag in 1943.

The final standings and crosstable:

References

External links
Kemeri 1937 International Tournament

Sport in Jūrmala
Chess competitions
Chess in Latvia
1937 in chess
1937 in Latvian sport